Joan Horrach Ripoll (born March 27, 1974) is a Spanish retired professional road racing cyclist.

Horrach's  biggest win of his career was Stage 11 of the 2006 Giro d'Italia. He won the stage by being in the break o the day and after making it to the final 3 riders he attacked as his companions crashed and held on to win by 5 seconds. As a domestique for his leaders Horrach spent most of his career working for others, occasionally given the opportunity to ride for himself.

After retiring he moved to Mallorca where he works as a Tour guide in Serra de Tramuntana on taking people on Mountain bikes, Road bikes and hiking.

Major results
Sources:

2000
 1st Stage 2 Grande Prémio Jornal de Notícias
2001
 1st  Overall Grande Prémio Jornal de Notícias
1st Stage 4
 2nd Overall Vuelta a Asturias
1st Stage 4
2002
 1st  Mountains classification, Setmana Catalana de Ciclisme
 2nd Overall Volta a Portugal
1st Stages 5 & 11
 2nd Overall Vuelta a Castilla y León
 7th Overall GP do Minho
2003
 3rd Overall Gran Premio Internacional Mitsubishi MR Cortez
 5th Overall Troféu Joaquim Agostinho
1st  Points classification
1st Stage 2
 10th Overall Volta a Portugal
2005
 9th Overall Escalada a Montjuïc
2006
 1st Stage 11 Giro d'Italia
2010
 1st Stage 3 (TTT) Vuelta a Burgos 
 2nd Trofeo Deià

General classification results timeline
Source:

References

External links

1974 births
Living people
Sportspeople from Mallorca
Spanish male cyclists
Spanish Giro d'Italia stage winners
Cyclists from the Balearic Islands